Mangshi (Jingpho: Mangshi Myu), former name Luxi, is a county-level city and the seat of Dehong Dai and Jingpo Autonomous Prefecture, western Yunnan province, China. Han Chinese, Dai people (Tai Nuea branch) and Jingpo people (Zaiwa branch) are the major ethnic groups. Luxi County was founded in 1949, and became a county-level city in 1996.

Etymology

The name "Mangshi" first appeared in 1443, when the Tai Nuea tusi Mangshi Yuyi Zhangguansi was established. In the history, an ethnicity named Mangshi lived in this area. The name of "" evolved from "" (the pinyin are same). Luxi is the former name of Mangshi, meaning "west of Lu [Salween] River".

In Tai Nuea language, the city name is Muang Khon, written in Chinese is "", meaning "city of dawn".

In 2008,  people participated in a public opinion survey in favour of restoring the historical name (Mangshi), with 96.96% supporting a name change to Mangshi. In 2010, the name was formally changed. "Mangshi" is the proper name of the city, however, the character "" itself means "city". The full name in Chinese language is "" (Mangshi), the official English translation in the Yearbook of Dehong is "Mangshi City".

History
 

Historically, Mangshi was divided among three tusi territories. Mangshi Lu, established by Yuan dynasty in 1276, was the first time the region was integrated into the administrative system of a Chinese dynasty. Mangshi Lu was part of Jinchi Xuanfusi, Yunnan Province. In 1277, the area was affected by the first Mongol invasion of Burma. Ming dynasty repealed Mangshi Lu and set Mangshi Fu in 1382. Because Mangshi chief Dao Fangge helped the Ming dynasty army in the Luchuan–Pingmian campaigns, Ming dynasty made him the Mangshi Tusi (native chieftain), and founded the agency Mangshi Yuyi Zhangguansi in 1443. In 1584, Ming dynasty created another tusi, Zhefang Fuxuanfusi in Zhefang area, formerly part of Longchuan Xuanfusi. In 1640, Mangshi Yuyi Zhangguansi upgraded to Mangshi Anfusi. In 1899, Qing dynasty set the 3rd tusi, Mengban Tuqianzong in modern Mangshi Area.

In Republic of China period, the Yunnan government appointed two "suppression commissars" to Mangban and Zhemao within the Mangshi area in 1913. Mangban suppression commissar administered Mangshi Anfusi and Mengban Tuqianzong territories, and Zhemao suppression commissar administered Zhefang Xuanfusi and Mengmao Anfusi (in Ruili) territories. The two suppression commissars were replaced by an administrative commissar in 1915, and a district named Mangzheban Administrative District was established. At the same time, Mengmao Anfusi was separated from the district, thus forming the boundaries of modern Mangshi. As a transition before formally establishing a county, Yunnan government set a Shezhiju (similar to a governing council) in Mangshi area named Mangzheban Shezhiju replacing Mangzheban District in 1929. The Administrative Bureau is a quasi-county level administrative division. Mengga is the seat of the bureau. It changed the name to Luxi Shezhiju in 1934. Imperial Japanese Army occupied Luxi at 4May 1942 and retreated at 11 December 1944 when Counterattack of Western Yunnan started. In 1949, Luxi Administrative Bureau finally became Luxi County, with the seat of county government at the town of Mangshi, and the first county magistrate was the acting Tusi Fang Kesheng. The Tusi system and the central bureaucracy still coexisted.

Fang Kesheng refused to join People's Republic of China, preferring to remain neutral. Eventually the People's Liberation Army advanced into Luxi in April 1950, and Fang Kesheng fled to Taiwan. His brother Fang Keguang succeeded be the acting tusi, and cooperated with the Chinese Communist Party. The three tusi were killed during the land reform movement in 1955. Luxi County became Luxi City (county-level city) in 1996, and changed the name to Mangshi City in 2010.

Geography

There are two main plains in Mangshi named Mangshi Ba and Zhefang Ba. The city of Mangshi is situated at the east of Mangshi Ba. Mountains are the primary landforms of Mangshi, making up approximately 84.48% of the territory. Mount Qingkou is the city's highest point, with an altitude of 2,889.1 meters. Manxin River's estuary (at Salween River) is the lowest point, with an altitude of 528 metres in Zhongshan Township. The mountains are branches of western Gaoligong Mountains.

Longchuan River is the border river between Mangshi and Lianghe County and Longchuan County on the north and west. Salween River on the southeast tip of Mangshi marks the international border between Mangshi and Myanmar's Shan State.

Climate

Administrative divisions

Mangshi currently comprises 12 administrative township-level subdivisions including one subdistrict, five towns and six townships.

Economy

As of 2016, Mangshi nominal GDP was CN￥ 9.628 billion, about 0.65% of the province's GDP, ranking 44th among county-level administrative units in Yunnan; its nominal GDP per capita was CN￥ 23,307, 66th in the province, lower than Yunnan average (CN￥ 30,949).

In 1958, Yunnan government regulated trade in border areas, and the town of Mangshi was excluded from the zone of border trade. In 1980, province government opened Manghai, Mangbing and Xiaogai as border trade markets. After Hu Yaobang, the General Secretary of the Chinese Communist Party inspected Dehong prefecture in 1985, Mangshi abolished all border checkpoints, and made the whole territory a border trade zone. The border trade and other tertiary sectors was prosperous in the 1990s. The proportion of three industrial sectors in 1978 was 65.6 : 16.3 : 18.1, and in 2016, 23.2 : 20.5 : 56.3.

Asian rice, sugarcane, tea, coffee, macadamia nut and fruits (banana, pineapple, mango, jackfruit etc.) are the main agricultural products of Mangshi, especially coffee. Mangshi has 19,056 ha. of paddy field, 9,165 ha. of sugarcane field, 7,504 ha. of macadamia forest, 5,870 ha. of coffee field and 5,469 ha. of fruit field in 2018. Asian Coffee Association was established at Mangshi in 2017. 13 countries are members of the association. Hogood Coffee is the largest domestic instant coffee producer in China, and the 10th largest civilian-run enterprise of Yunnan.

Population

In 2016, Mangshi had a total population of 415,700 over the whole county-level city, of which 171.2 thousand resided in the city core, the subdistrict of Menghuan.

According to the 2010 census, Mangshi has 204,083 Han citizens, 52.34% of total population. Other main ethnicities are Dai and Jingpo, which has a population with 132,421 and 29,208. Mangshi has the largest number of Palaung people in any county-level subdivision of China, with a population of 9,986, which mainly live in Santaishan Palaung Ethnic Township.

Historically, Dai people lived in the plains. Jingpo people immigrated to the mountains from the Tibetan Plateau in the 16th century. Han Chinese became the majority because of the Ming conquest of Yunnan and several Sino-Burmese wars, and the subsequent stationing of Chinese army in the area.

Culture

Dai people in Mangshi speak Tai Nuea language, while Jingpo people speak Zaiwa and Jingpho. Zaiwa is the most populous branch of Jingpo in Mangshi.

Almost all the Dai and Palaung people follows Theravada Buddhism. Many villages have their own Buddhist temple, called "Zhuangfang" or "Miansi". They are the center for religion activities and education, and also the entertainment venues for villagers. Expenditure of the temple and the monk life costs are paid by the villagers. An average Dai farmer spends one-fifth of his annual income for religion-related activities in 1988. In Jingpo folk religion, various gods as well as ancestral spirits are worshipped.

Water-Sprinkling Festival (in Thailand called "Songkran") and Manau are the grandest festivals of the Dai and Jingpo. They are both statutory holidays in Dehong Prefecture. The 15,000-capacity Dehong Stadium, a football stadium, is also used for cultural events.

Transport

Tusi Fang Keming of Mangshi and Duo Jianxun of Zhefang built a road linking Mangshi and Wanding in 1926. An Indian engineer was invited to design the route. The road was completed in 1931, and became a part of the Burma Road in 1937. In modern China National Highways network, this road is part of G320 Highway. Longling-Ruili Expressway opened on 31 December 2015, and is the first expressway of Mangshi. It forms part of G56 Hangzhou–Ruili Expressway and AH14. A provincial highway, Mangshi-Lianghe Expressway is currently under construction. Another provincial expressway, Ruili-Menglian Expressway, is planned.

Although Mangshi has a 68.23 km-long borderline with Myanmar, it has no national port of entry. There are three border crossing without customs control into Myanmar serving the locals. They are Manghai, Zhongshan and Bangda. Manghai links Mong Ko in Myanmar, also known as Monekoe.

Dali–Ruili railway is under construction, with two stations in Mangshi: Mangshi and Mangshi West.

Dehong Mangshi Airport is the only airport in Dehong Prefecture. It saw 1,652,533 passengers and 13,982 flights in 2017.

Society

Dehong Sports Center is located on the west of Mangshi, with a 21,000-capacity stadium, a 3,200-capacity basketball gym, a 2,150-capacity aquatics center, a 6-courts tennis gym and other outdoor sports fields. The sports center was built in 2008, and has a building area of 36,813.49m2.

Dehong People's Hospital is a Tertiary B-level hospital established in 1954 in southeast of Mangshi. It has 1,200 beds and the service area covered up Dehong, Longling, Tengchong and part of Myanmar.

Dehong Teachers' College is the main higher education college of Dehong, established in 2006. It is a technical college but under the working for upgrade to an undergraduate education university. Many Burmese students are studying abroad in the college.

Dehong's media is multilingual, reflecting its diverse ethnic makeup. Dehong TV Station was established in 1991, with programs in Chinese, Tai Nuea, Jingpho and Zaiwa. Dehong TV Station is the only TV station that uses four languages in China. Dehong Unity News is the official newspaper of Dehong Prefecture Committee of the Chinese Communist Party. The newspaper using five languages: Chinese, Tai Nuea, Jingpho, Zaiwa and Lisu. It is the only newspaper that uses five languages in China. Pauk-Phaw, the first Burmese newspaper of China, was founded in Mangshi in 2015 and is published by Dehong Unity Newspaper office. It serves the 50,000 Burmese who live in China.

Tourism

3.3 million tourists visited Mangshi in 2015, and generated a tourism income of CN￥ 5.09 billion for the city. Puti Temple, Wuyun Temple and Foguang Temple are well known Buddhist temples in Mangshi. Tiecheng Pagoda, Fengping Pagoda and Menghuan Pagoda are well known Buddhist pagodas. Tiecheng Pagoda, also known as "Shubao Pagoda", was built in Qianlong era, Qing dynasty. A seed fell in the crack of the pagoda about 200 years ago, and now, the pagoda is wrapped by the bodhi tree. Mengbanaxi Exotics Garden, a garden for valuable ancient trees and tree fossils, is the only AAAA state-level tourist destination of Mangshi.

Friendly cities
Mangshi currently maintains friendship agreements with the following foreign
  Gangneung, Gangwon-do, South Korea

See also
 List of administrative divisions of Yunnan

Notes

References

External links
 

 
County-level divisions of Dehong Prefecture
Cities in Yunnan
China–Myanmar border crossings